Abbasabad-e Qandi (also Romanized as ‘Abbāsābād-e Qandī) is a village in Miyan Jovin Rural District, Helali District, Joghatai County, Razavi Khorasan Province, Iran. At the 2006 census, its population was 573, in 125 families.

See also 

 List of cities, towns and villages in Razavi Khorasan Province

References 

Populated places in Joghatai County